Mintho is a genus of flies in the family Tachinidae.

Species
Mintho argentea Bezzi, 1908
Mintho compressa (Fabricius, 1787)
Mintho flavicoxa Bezzi, 1911
Mintho praeceps (Scopoli, 1763)
Mintho rufiventris (Fallén, 1817)

References

Diptera of Europe
Diptera of Africa
Diptera of Asia
Tachininae
Tachinidae genera
Taxa named by Jean-Baptiste Robineau-Desvoidy